Metrioidea is a genus of skeletonizing leaf beetles in the family Chrysomelidae. There are about 18 described species in Metrioidea. It is found in Australasia, the Nearctic, the Neotropics, and Indomalaya.

Species
These 18 species belong to the genus Metrioidea:

 Metrioidea atriceps (Horn, 1893)
 Metrioidea bimaculatus (Perroud & Montrouzier, 1864)
 Metrioidea blakeae (Wilcox, 1965)
 Metrioidea brunnea (Crotch, 1873) (corn silk beetle)
 Metrioidea chiricahuensis (Blake, 1942)
 Metrioidea convexa (Blake, 1942)
 Metrioidea cornuphallus Beenen, 2008
 Metrioidea elachista (Blake, 1942)
 Metrioidea lateralimaculatus Beenen, 2008
 Metrioidea millei Beenen, 2008
 Metrioidea morula (J.L.LeConte, 1865)
 Metrioidea ocularis (Blake, 1942)
 Metrioidea petrae Beenen, 2008
 Metrioidea popenoei (Blake, 1942)
 Metrioidea punctatissima (Blake, 1942)
 Metrioidea schoelleri Beenen, 2008
 Metrioidea varicornis (J. L. LeConte, 1868)
 Metrioidea wanati Beenen, 2008

References

Further reading

External links

 

Galerucinae
Chrysomelidae genera
Articles created by Qbugbot
Taxa named by Léon Fairmaire